Jamgaon is a village located in Ashti taluka, Beed district

, it had a total population of 2,640.

Nivrutti Dhas High School is located in the village.

References

External links

Notable Person
Suresh Dash

Villages in Beed district